Barry Hodges (born 20 January 1950) is a former Australian rules footballer who played for the Melbourne Football Club in the Victorian Football League (VFL).

Notes

External links 

1950 births
Australian rules footballers from Victoria (Australia)
Melbourne Football Club players
Living people